Karel Jarůšek (born 2 December 1952) is a Czech football manager and former player.

As a player, Jarůšek played mostly for FC Zbrojovka Brno. In 1978, he won the Czechoslovak First League with Zbrojovka. From 1977 to 1980 he was also a member of the Czechoslovakia national football team. After finishing his active career, he started with coaching. Jarůšek coached FC Zbrojovka Brno, FK Drnovice and SFC Opava in the Czech Republic.

From 2003 to 2004 he was a Senator in the Senate of the Czech Republic, where he represented the senate district no. 58 Brno-City and the Civic Democratic Party.

Footnotes

References
  Profile at ČMFS website
  Profile at FC Zbrojovka Brno official website
  Profile at Senát.cz

1952 births
Czech footballers
Czechoslovak footballers
Czechoslovakia international footballers
FC Zbrojovka Brno players
Czech football managers
FC Zbrojovka Brno managers
SFC Opava managers
People from Blansko
Civic Democratic Party (Czech Republic) Senators
Living people
Czechoslovak expatriate footballers
Czech expatriate footballers
Expatriate footballers in Greece
Expatriate footballers in Austria
Czechoslovak expatriate sportspeople in Greece
Czechoslovak expatriate sportspeople in Austria
Czech expatriate sportspeople in Austria
1. Wiener Neustädter SC players
Association football midfielders
FK Drnovice managers
Panserraikos F.C. players